Francis Yarborough, D.D. was an Oxford college head.

Yarborough was born at Campsall and educated at Brasenose College, Oxford. He held livings at Over Worton and Aynho; and was Principal of Brasenose from 1745 until his death 24 April 1770.

Notes

 

|

18th-century English Anglican priests
Alumni of Brasenose College, Oxford
Principals of Brasenose College, Oxford
1770 deaths
People from the West Riding of Yorkshire (before 1974)